"The Wandering Juvie" is the sixteenth episode of the fifteenth season of the American animated television series The Simpsons. It originally aired on the Fox network in the United States on March 28, 2004. It guest-starred Sarah Michelle Gellar as Gina Vendetti. It also guest-starred Charles Napier and Jane Kaczmarek. Bart gets sent to juvenile hall after registering for gifts at a department store and having a fraudulent wedding to obtain gifts. This episode sees the first appearance of Gina Vendetti, who later appears in "Moonshine River".

Plot
When the Simpson family is at the Costington's department store, Bart uses the wedding gift registry as a prank to register himself and his bride, "Lotta Cooties", for wedding presents. Bart invites many people to his so-called "wedding" and plans to take all the unused gifts back for store credit, but he is stopped by Chief Wiggum, who arrests Bart and rejects his bribe of the wedding presents. Bart is sentenced to six months of juvenile detention by Judge Constance Harm.

At the detention center, Bart is afraid he will be buried alive in the sandpit or photographed being punched while going down a slide. He soon notices that the girls' Juvie is on the other side of a chain-link fence. Bart attempts to schmooze with these girls, only to have them attack and immobilize him. One of the girls, Gina Vendetti, uses a knife to destroy Bart's uniform, threatening to castrate him next time he comes near their fence. Bart's problems continue when two weeks before his release he is partnered with Gina for the dance by the warden. When they are dancing, Gina escapes with Bart using a rope, finding themselves on a window ledge. Due to the fact that they are handcuffed together, Gina is forced to bring a reluctant Bart along before the window can be closed, though he only comes after she kisses him. Slowly, they gain each other's trust.

On the lam, the duo look for a blacksmith who can remove their cuffs. They are freed, but after it happens, Gina is alone and forlorn. She starts crying and admits to Bart that she has no family. When he sympathizes with her, she angrily tackles him until the police come and arrest them (and a bear that Cletus correctly predicted would attack Wiggum). Feeling terrible for causing Bart's sentence to be extended, Gina confesses that she was behind the escape, clearing Bart of further charges. In the end, the Simpsons and the warden step in to help Gina feel better for being without family, offering a Mexican food feast in her cell.

Cultural references 
 Gina's surname, "Vendetti", resembles the Italian word "vendetta", which means "revenge".
 The episode's title is a play on the name of a figure from medieval Christian folklore, the Wandering Jew.
 The "Little Hooker" T-shirt line sold at Costington's is a spoof of clothing manufacturers marketing adult fashions toward a pre-teen (especially female) demographic made by Abercrombie & Fitch and others.
 The Itchy & Scratchy cartoon, The Battle of Slaughter-Loo, is a pun on the Battle of Waterloo.
 Much of this episode's plot (where a shackled-together Bart and Gina escape prison and learn to work together to survive) is inspired from the 1958 film The Defiant Ones.
 When Gina calls Bart a "family guy" it is a reference to the animated TV series Family Guy which also airs on Fox (although Family Guy had been canceled and off the network for over two years by the airing of this episode) and focuses on a dysfunctional family, furthering the supposed rivalry between Matt Groening and Seth MacFarlane (who is a fan of The Simpsons, according to the DVD commentary of the season four episode PTV).
 In a nod to Disney, Gina explains to Bart that she got into juvie because she pushed Snow White off the Sleeping Beauty Castle at Disneyland.
 Seymour Skinner makes a remark about his mother winning dishes on the long-running game show, Let's Make a Deal on which dinnerware was one of the staple prizes.
 Chief Wiggum's remark, "Well, well, if it isn't Punch and Juvie" is a reference to the puppet show, Punch and Judy.
 The Ten Habits of Highly Effective Criminals, Snake's self-help book targeted at criminals, is inspired by the 1989 self-help book, The Seven Habits of Highly Effective People by Stephen Covey.
 The sign in the warden's office — "HIS JUDGEMENT COMETH AND THAT RIGHT SOON" — is the same as the one seen in Warden Norton's office in the 1994 movie, The Shawshank Redemption.
 The heavily edited Itchy & Scratchy short is reminiscent of classic cartoons (e.g., Looney Tunes and Merrie Melodies) being edited on television due to issues of violence, racial stereotypes, and subject matter deemed inappropriate for children.
 The song played when Bart scans all the wedding gifts is "White Wedding" by Billy Idol.
 Bart comments that his wedding prank is his "Sgt. Peppers", referring to The Beatles album, Sgt. Pepper's Lonely Hearts Club Band, which is often considered the band's magnum opus.

Citations

External links 
 

The Simpsons (season 15) episodes
2004 American television episodes
Juvenile delinquency in fiction
Fiction about prison escapes